Major General Cecil Wotton Toovey CB, CBE, MC & Bar (17 April 1891 – 23 February 1954) was a senior British Indian Army officer who commanded the North Western Army, India during the Second World War.

Military career
Toovey was educated at Malvern College and commissioned as a second lieutenant into the 9th Battalion, Middlesex Regiment from the Inns of Court Officers Training Corps on 3 May 1913. He served with his regiment during the early part of the First World War before transferring to the Indian Army in 1917, where he was attached to the 82nd Punjabis. He was awarded the Military Cross (MC) for organising and leading a counterattack when in command of his battalion in 1919 on the North West Frontier.

After attending the Staff College, Quetta from 1924 to 1925, he was awarded a bar to his MC for gallantry during operations on the North West Frontier during 1930–31. He was appointed Commanding Officer (CO) of the 3rd Battalion, 1st Punjab Regiment in January 1937 then Assistant Adjutant-General at GHQ India in April 1939.

He served in the Second World War as Indian Army Liaison Officer at Middle East Command from May 1940, Commanding Officer, Lines of Communication Eritrea from April 1941 and Deputy Adjutant General at GHQ India from October 1941. He went on to be General Officer Commanding (GOC) Rawalpindi District in November 1943 and General Officer Commanding-in-Chief (GOC-in-C) North Western Army in June 1945.

He reverted to command of the Rawalpindi District in October 1945. He retired in January 1947 and died on 23 February 1954.

References

Bibliography

External links
Generals of World War II

 

1891 births
1954 deaths
Indian Army generals of World War II
Companions of the Order of the Bath
Commanders of the Order of the British Empire
Recipients of the Military Cross
Middlesex Regiment officers
Graduates of the Staff College, Quetta
British Army personnel of World War I
Indian Army personnel of World War I
British Indian Army generals